John Jones Homestead is a historic home located at Van Cortlandtville, Westchester County, New York. It is a large, -story, 18th-century residence with Federal-style detailing. The five-bay, timber-frame dwelling sits on a massive rubble stone foundation.  It has a gambrel roof with three dormers and pierced by three massive stone chimneys.  A 1-story rectangular wing is sheathed in clapboard. Also on the property is a contributing small barn.

It was added to the National Register of Historic Places in 1989.

See also
National Register of Historic Places listings in northern Westchester County, New York

References

"Mrak

Houses on the National Register of Historic Places in New York (state)
Federal architecture in New York (state)
Houses in Westchester County, New York
National Register of Historic Places in Westchester County, New York
Underground Railroad in New York (state)